Joe or Joseph Willis may refer to:

 Joe Willis (baseball) (1890–1966), Major League Baseball pitcher
 Joe Willis (soccer) (born 1988), American soccer player
 Joe Willis (footballer) (born 2001), English footballer
 Joseph Willis, 19th-century Baptist minister in Louisiana
Joe Willis, character in The Faculty
 Joseph Willis (footballer) (1896–1953), Scottish footballer

See also